The 2018 United States Senate election in Minnesota took place on November 6, 2018, to elect a United States Senator from Minnesota. Incumbent Democratic–Farmer–Labor U.S. Senator Amy Klobuchar was reelected in a landslide. This election was held alongside a special election for Minnesota's other Senate seat, which was held by Al Franken until he resigned in January 2018. U.S. House elections, a gubernatorial election, State House elections, and other elections were also held.

The candidate filing deadline was June 5, 2018, and the primary election was held on August 14, 2018.

Democratic-Farmer-Labor primary

Candidates

Nominated
 Amy Klobuchar, incumbent U.S. Senator

Eliminated in primary
 Steve Carlson
 Stephen A. Emery
 David R. Groves
 Leonard J. Richards

Endorsements

Results

Republican primary

Candidates

Nominated
 Jim Newberger, state representative (Minnesota GOP convention endorsed)

Eliminated in primary
 Merrill Anderson, Past Candidate (Mayor of Minneapolis), Past Candidate (Governor of Minnesota)
 Rae Hart Anderson
 Rocky De La Fuente, 2016 Reform Party Presidential Nominee and perennial candidate

Declined
 Tim Pawlenty, former governor of Minnesota (running for governor)

Endorsements

Results

Minor parties and independents

Candidates
 Paula M. Overby (Green Party)
Dennis Schuller (Legal Marijuana Now Party)

General election

Predictions

Debates
On August 24, MPR News hosted a debate between Amy Klobuchar and Jim Newberger at the Minnesota State Fair.

Fundraising

Polling

Results 
Klobuchar won the election by a margin of 24.10%. She carried a clear majority of the state's 87 counties, won every congressional district, and had the biggest statewide margin of any statewide candidate in Minnesota in 2018. Klobuchar ran up huge margins in the state's population centers and trounced Newberger in the counties encompassing the Minneapolis-St. Paul area. As in her 2012 victory, she also won many rural counties. Klobuchar was sworn in for a third term on January 3, 2019.

By congressional district
Klobuchar won all of 8 congressional districts.

Voter demographics

See also
 2018 Minnesota elections

References

External links
Elections & Voting - Minnesota Secretary of State
Candidates at Vote Smart
Candidates at Ballotpedia
Campaign finance at FEC
Campaign finance at OpenSecrets

Official campaign websites
Amy Klobuchar (D) for Senate
Jim Newberger (R) for Senate
Paula Overby (G) for Senate

2018
Minnesota
United States Senate
Amy Klobuchar